, marketed in some English-speaking countries under the name Libogen and Livita, is an energy drink manufactured by Taisho Pharmaceutical Co. and its licensee Osotspa. Widely available in Asia, it retails in brown-colored translucent 100 ml bottles and has a distinctive bright yellow color. Lipovitan is marketed to alleviate physical and mental fatigue.

Ingredients 

The primary ingredient in the Lipovitan product line is taurine. Stronger formulas of the drink include Lipovitan D, which contains 1000 mg of taurine, 20 mg of nicotinic acid extract (vitamin B3), 5 mg each of vitamin B1, B2 and B6, and 50 mg of caffeine. Lipovitan D Super contains 2000 mg of taurine and 300 mg of arginine. MAXIO contains 3000 mg of taurine. The warning label on all of its products say not to consume more than 100 ml per day.

Lipovitan products are sold in Japan and in stores in countries that carry Asian products.

History 
The introduction of Lipovitan predates Red Bull’s precursor Krating Daeng by 14 years, having been first released in 1962. Arginine is the main active ingredient in the modified Red Bull sold in Japan.

Sponsorship 
The Japan national rugby team is sponsored by Lipovitan D.

See also
 Krating Daeng
 Bacchus-F

References

External links

Products website 
Company website 
Info 

Energy drinks
Japanese drinks